AO Raiffeisenbank is a bank in Russia. It is a subsidiary of Raiffeisen Bank International, which in turn is a fully controlled subsidiary of Austrian banking group Raiffeisen Zentralbank. Included in the list of systemically important banks. The headquarters is located in Moscow.

At the end of 2020, it ranked 7th among Russian banks in net profit (36.788 billion rubles), 10th in terms of assets (1,457.253 billion rubles) and 11th in terms of capital (189.236 billion rubles). In the Forbes World Best Banks list, published in April 2021, Raiffeisen Bank ranks first among Russian banks.

History 
Raiffeisenbank is part of the international banking Raiffeisen Group.

In 1927, the central bank was founded in Vienna, which is now the main link of the Raiffeisen banking group. The Raiffeisen Group began to expand outside of Austria in 1986. Now Raiffeisen Bank International is a leading universal bank in Central and Eastern Europe with the largest branch network of all Western banking groups listed on the Vienna Stock Exchange.

Raiffeisenbank in Russia 
It was founded in 1996 as Raiffeisenbank Austria and has expanded following the 2006 takeover of Russia's Impexbank.

In 2001, a branch of the bank was opened in St. Petersburg, and in 2005 — in Samara, Yekaterinburg, Novosibirsk, and in 2006 — in Krasnodar. In 2018, the bank begins to develop a digital presence that allows serving customers without physical branches. In 2019, Raiffeisenbank's virtual offices are open in 109 cities of Russia. At 2021, the geography of digital presence is more than 300 cities.

In 2006, Raiffeisenbank acquires 100% of the shares of JSC "IMPEXBANK". A year later, they are united under the unified brand of Raiffeisenbank CJSC and Raiffeisenbank becomes the largest bank with the participation of foreign capital in Russia (as of 2006).

In July 2021, Raiffeisen Bank International AG filed a lawsuit against the Arbitration Court of Moscow for recovery from PJSC "Mobile TeleSystems" about 615 million rubles. The third person is attracted by the Federal Antimonopoly Service (FAS) of Russia.

In September 2021, Raiffeisenbank launched a service for translating salaries on the fact of worked days, for which the daily salary calculation module was created. Project partner — Payday from VK (earlier  — Mail.ru Group).

Key numbers 
CIR indicator (COST to Income Ratio; The ratio of operating costs for income) for 2020 amounted to 37.8%, the cost of risk (COR) is 1.2%. The profitability of capital (ROE) at the end of 2020 amounted to 21.7% after payment of taxes, at the end of 2020 the share of impairment loans amounted to 3.5%.

Ratings and awards 
In 2021, the American edition of Forbes called Raiffeisenbank as the best bank of Russia. A year earlier, Raiffeisenbank topped a list of 100 best banks in the country according to Forbes Russia magazine.

In 2019, the Cobranding Map of the loyalty of Lenta-Raiffeisenbank won in the nomination "Best Cobranding Map of the Bank and Retail" International Prize Loyalty Awards Russia. In the same year, Raiffeisenbank was recognized as the best foreign bank in Russia according to the international financial edition of Emea Finance.

In 2018, the International Consulting Company Korn Ferry Haygroup (KFHG) on the results of studies conducted in 2016 and 2017 included Raiffeisenbank in the Top-3 of the best employers in Russia among 50 companies.

In 2018, Euromoney magazine called Friedrich Wilhelm Raiffeisen "The best bank for private banking services for wealthy customers in Central and Eastern Europe". His work was also awarded award-winning Spear's Russia magazine in the nominations "Impeccable reputation in the banking industry"  and "reference work with wealthy clients in Russia and abroad".

See also

List of banks
List of banks in Russia

References

External links 
 Raiffeisenbank 

Banks of Russia
Russian brands
Companies based in Moscow
Banks established in 1996
Raiffeisen Zentralbank